The 1888 New Hampshire gubernatorial election was held on November 6, 1888. Republican nominee David H. Goodell defeated Democratic nominee Charles H. Amsden with 49.45% of the vote.

General election

Candidates
Major party candidates
David H. Goodell, Republican
Charles H. Amsden, Democratic

Other candidates
Edgar L. Carr, Prohibition

Results

References

1888
New Hampshire
Gubernatorial